In the City is a 2003 Spanish ensemble drama film directed by Cesc Gay. The film portrays the daily lives, secrets, lies, loneliness and frustrations of a group of eight thirty-something friends living in Barcelona.

Cast

Home media
 In the City  is available in Region 1 DVD in Spanish with English subtitles.

Awards
 Goya Awards:  Best Supporting Actor (Eduard Fernández)

See also 
 List of Spanish films of 2003

External links
 
2003 films
2000s Spanish-language films
2003 comedy-drama films
Films set in Barcelona
Films directed by Cesc Gay
Spanish comedy-drama films
2000s Spanish films